What Belongs to Darkness is a 1922 German silent drama film directed by Martin Hartwig and starring Karl Etlinger, Erra Bognar, and Fritz Kortner.

The film's sets were designed by the art director Alfred Columbus.

Cast

References

Bibliography

External links

1922 films
Films of the Weimar Republic
German silent feature films
German black-and-white films
1922 drama films
German drama films
Films directed by Martin Hartwig
Silent drama films
1920s German films